From C to C: Chinese Canadian Stories of Migration is a 2011 documentary film produced and directed by Jordan Paterson. The film premiered on July 16, 2011 on CBC television.

Synopsis 
Filmed in Canada and China's Guangdong province, From C to C contrasts the historical injustices faced by Chinese migrants and their families over the last century with the experiences of contemporary Chinese Canadian youth who embody diverse, transnational identities across Canada today. With interviews in four languages—Cantonese, Mandarin, Taishanese and English—the film conveys the impact of the historical Head Tax and Exclusion Act (1923 - 1947) imposed on Chinese immigrants to Canada. The film features interviews with Chinese Canadian veterans George Chow and Frank Wong, as well as 104-year-old head tax redress activist Charlie Quan.

Awards and nominations

References

External links
 Official Film Website
 Official Film Facebook Webpage
 Official Film YouTube Webpage
 Official Film Twitter Webpage

2011 television films
2011 films
2011 documentary films
Cinema of British Columbia
Documentary films about immigration
Anti-Chinese sentiment in Canada
History of Chinese Canadians
Films about Chinese Canadians
Documentary films about racism in Canada
Canadian documentary television films
Films about immigration in Canada
2010s Canadian films